Elections to the Haryana Legislative Assembly were held in 1977 to elect members of the 90 constituencies in Haryana, India. The Janata Party won the popular vote and a majority of seats and Devi Lal was appointed as the Chief Minister of Haryana. The number of constituencies was set as 90, by the recommendation of the Delimitation Commission of India.

Results

Elected members

See also
List of constituencies of the Haryana Legislative Assembly
1977 elections in India

References 

State Assembly elections in Haryana
Haryana
1970s in Haryana